Seoul Namsan Traditional Theater is located in central Seoul. There audiences can experience traditional Korean culture in contrast to contemporary Seoul.

Location
The theater introduces traditional arts, and is considered to be establishing itself as a major cultural attraction of Seoul. It is also held to be the best place to hear Korean traditional music performances.

Seoul Namsan Traditional Theater is located in Namsangol Hanok Village, a place that is visited by around 1.8 million domestic and international visitors annually. The theater is in the form of a traditional Korean house, where it is said that you can feel the mood and breath of classic scholars from the past.
An outdoor garden is connected to the lobby of the theater, so people there can enjoy the view of Seoul Tower and the scent of the pine trees of Namsan Mountain.

Performances

Namsan Traditional Theater holds various kinds of performances: Pansori, Korean musicals, and gayageum and geomungo recitals. In addition, there are programs specifically for foreigners to experience Korean traditions. The music performances and programs are changed monthly.

References

Buildings and structures in Seoul
Theatres in South Korea